Frayssinet is a commune in the Lot department in south-western France.

Geography
The river Céou flows westward through the northern part of the commune.

See also
Communes of the Lot department

References

Communes of Lot (department)